The Testa di Comagna (French: Tête de Comagne) is a 2,106 metres high peak on the Italian side of the Pennine Alps.

Geography 

The mountain is located on the water divide between the main Aosta Valley and the Val d'Ayas, one of its tributary valleys.
The long stretch of the water divide linking towards NW the Testa di Comagna with monte Zerbion touches its lowest point with Col de Joux (1.640 m). In the opposite direction the water divide continues with the saddle of Col Tzecore (1.607 m}) and then rises up to the Mont d'Arbaz (1.651 m).

Close to the summit of the Testa di Comagna stands a summit cross, substained by a masonry basement. The mountain, thanks to its central position in the Aosta Valley and its isolation from higher mountains, offers a very wide panorama including many of the main summits of the area such as Monte Emilius, Mont Néry, monte Bianco and Matterhorn.

SOIUSA classification 
According to SOIUSA (International Standardized Mountain Subdivision of the Alps) the mountain can be classified in the following way:
 main part = Western Alps
 major sector = North Western Alps
 section = Pennine Alps
 subsection = Monte Rosa Alps
 supergroup =Contrafforti valdostani del Monte Rosa
 group = Costiera Tournalin-Zerbion
 code = I/B-9.III-B.4

Access to the summit

Summer 
The mountain does not have special alpinistic interest but is a popular hiking destination because its easy access and the very interesting panorama which offers on the Aosta Valley mountains. In order to reach the summit a good starting point is the col de Joux, but one can also start from Sommarèse or from Plésod. On the contrary reaching the summit by mountain bike requires good skills.

Winter 
The Testa di Comagna is also a classical destination for Ski mountaineering, considered of medium difficulty. and hiking with snow shoes. Winter routes follow more or less the same itineraries used for summertime access to the summit.

Maps
 Military Geographic Institute (IGM) official maps of Italy, 1:25.000 and 1:100.000 scale, on-line version
 Carta dei sentieri e dei rifugi scala 1:50.000 n. 5 Cervino e Monte Rosa, Istituto Geografico Centrale - Torino

References

Two-thousanders of Italy
Mountains of Aosta Valley
Pennine Alps